Axelsberg metro station is a station on the red line of the Stockholm metro, located in Axelsberg in the district of Hägersten. The station was opened on 16 May 1965 as part of the extension from Örnsberg to Sätra. The distance to Slussen is 6.4 km.

References

Red line (Stockholm metro) stations
Railway stations opened in 1965